Depal is a village and a gram panchayat in Ramnagar II Block in Contai subdivision of Purba Medinipur district in the Indian state of West Bengal.

Geography

Location

Urbanisation
93.55% of the population of Contai subdivision live in the rural areas. Only 6.45% of the population live in the urban areas and it is considerably behind Haldia subdivision in urbanization, where 20.81% of the population live in urban areas.

Note: The map alongside presents some of the notable locations in the subdivision. All places marked in the map are linked in the larger full screen map.

Demographics
As per 2011 Census of India Depal had a total population of 3,359 of which 1,705 (51%) were males and 1,654 (49%) were females. Population below 6 years was 294. The total number of literates in Depal was 2,782 (90.77% of the population over 6 years).

Transport
Depal stands at the junction point of Depal-Majna-Kanthi Road and Egra-Ramnagar Road.

Education
Ramnagar College at Depal was established in 1972. In addition to courses in arts, science and commerce, it offers courses in hospitality and tourism, and fishery and farm management.

Ramnagar B.Ed College at Depal offers B.Ed. course.

Healthcare
There is a primary health centre at Hamirpur, PO Depal (with 2 beds).

References

Villages in Purba Medinipur district